DSCA can refer to:

Defense Security Cooperation Agency, a US military agency
Defense Support of Civil authorities, a US military doctrine